Ofelia Salazar is a fictional character in the first three seasons of the television series Fear the Walking Dead, she is portrayed by Swedish-American actress Mercedes Mason.

Character biography
Ofelia is the daughter of Daniel and Griselda Salazar. After the death of her mother and apparent loss of her father, Ofelia becomes much more distant.  Ofelia is described as being born in El Salvador and immigrating to Los Angeles with her parents when she was a baby. She is strong, independent, beautiful; professional but fierce, protective of her parents whom she feels are backwards – no one messes with her mother and father.

Season 1

Ofelia is first seen when the Manawas find refuge with her family in their gated barbershop-home. The group inside the barbershop remains trapped, while a riot outside intensifies. While a riot rages outside, a mob sets fire to the store adjoining the barbershop, forcing the Salazars and Manawas to flee. The group reaches Travis' truck and escapes. Ofelia and her group join the Clarks. Ofelia tells Daniel they should flee with Travis, but Daniel insists his family can survive alone and will join his cousin later. Ofelia starts a brief relationship with Adam, an Army Corporal in the California National Guard. Griselda dies of septic shock at a hospital. She joins the group as they drive to the National Guard's headquarters to rescue Liza, Griselda, and Nick. Adams agrees to be their guide when let go by Travis. The group infiltrates the base. Travis, Madison, Daniel, and Ofelia go inside, while Alicia and Chris stay behind. Meanwhile, the walkers breach the perimeter defenses and swarm the base. Travis' group reach the holding cells and set the detainees free before reuniting with Nick, Liza, and Strand. They try to escape through the medical ward, where they discover Dr. Exner has euthanized all of the patients. Dr. Exner tells them of an escape route before presumably committing suicide. Before they can escape, the group encounters Adams, who shoots Ofelia in the arm. Enraged, Travis brutally beats Adams and leaves him for dead. Strand leads the group to his oceanside mansion, where he reveals to Nick that he owns a yacht which he plans to escape on, called the Abigail.

Season 2

This section needs an accurate update.

Season 3

Ofelia ultimately leaves the group after finding the Rosarito Beach Hotel survivors, leading to her eventual alignment with Qaletaqa Walker's group, and becoming a member of the Black Hat Reservation. After getting caught in the middle of the conflict between the Broke Jaw Ranch community and the Black Hat Reservation Native Americans, Ofelia is bitten by a walker while attempting to clear an air vent. Ofelia manages to clear the vent, but shortly afterwards begins to succumb to her walker bite. She dies of the bite moments before Madison can reunite Ofelia with her father and Daniel is forced to shoot his own daughter to prevent her from turning, devastating him.

Reception
Mason received positive reviews for her portrayal.

Ofelia's death in the season 3 episode "El Matadero" received criticism, UPROXX said; "It wasn't cruel enough, however, to simply kill her. Nope: After being bitten, Ofelia survived many many hours longer. How long, exactly? Long enough to drive from Broken Jaw Ranch and across the Mexico border, where she survived until nightfall hopped up on pain meds. She died about 30 seconds before her father, Daniel, arrived from the Tijuana dam. That's right: After splitting Ofelia and Daniel apart in the season two midseason finale, they have been teasing their reunion for the last six or seven episodes. And just as they were about to finally see each other again, Ofelia croaks. Cruel twist, bro."

References

Characters created by Robert Kirkman
Fear the Walking Dead
Fictional characters from California
Television characters introduced in 2015
The Walking Dead (franchise) characters